Mona Geijer-Falkner (2 January 1887 – 3 December 1973) was a Swedish film actress. She appeared in more than 100 films between 1920 and 1969.

Selected filmography

 The Rivals (1926)
 Getting Married (1926)
 Frida's Songs (1930)
 Skipper's Love (1931)
 The Southsiders (1932)
 International Match (1932)
 Black Roses (1932)
 Saturday Nights (1933)
 Simon of Backabo (1934)
 Andersson's Kalle (1934)
 Swedenhielms (1935)
 The Girls of Uppakra (1936)
 Witches' Night (1937)
 We at Solglantan (1939)
 The Fight Continues (1941)
 The Talk of the Town (1941)
 There's a Fire Burning (1943)
 In Darkest Smaland (1943)
 Count Only the Happy Moments (1944)
 The Journey Away (1945)
 The Girls in Smaland (1945)
 Dynamite (1947)
 Music in Darkness (1948)
 Life at Forsbyholm Manor (1948)
 Robinson in Roslagen (1948)
 Only a Mother (1949)
 Father Bom (1949)
 Åsa-Nisse (1949)
 Teacher's First Born (1950)
 Andersson's Kalle (1950)
 My Name Is Puck (1951)
 Love (1952)
 Åsa-Nisse on Holiday (1953)
 Unmarried Mothers (1953)
 The Yellow Squadron (1954)
 Whoops! (1955)
Seventh Heaven (1956)
 Stage Entrance (1956)
 Åsa-Nisse in Military Uniform (1958)
 A Lion in Town (1959)
 Åsa-Nisse as a Policeman (1960)
 Two Living, One Dead (1961)
 Lovely Is the Summer Night (1961)
 Ticket to Paradise (1962)
 The Lady in White (1962)
 Sten Stensson Returns (1963)

References

External links

1887 births
1973 deaths
Swedish film actresses
Swedish silent film actresses
Actresses from Stockholm
20th-century Swedish actresses

Mona